XEQC-AM was a radio station broadcasting on 1390 kHz in Puerto Peñasco, Sonora. It was owned by Ángel Tanori Cruz and known as La Reyna del Mar.

XEQC's concession was not renewed following its expiration in 2014. The station continued broadcasting as a pirate until 2017, when its broadcasting equipment was seized.

History
XEQC received its concession on June 5, 1972, making it the first radio station in Puerto Peñasco. It was a 500-watt daytimer and later broadcast with 1,000 watts during the day and 150 at night.

In 2009, XEQC was authorized to move to FM as XHEQC-FM 93.5. The move never materialized, and the station ultimately ceased transmitting eight years later when the Federal Telecommunications Institute shut down 1390 AM as a pirate, imposing a fine on Tanori Cruz and seizing the station's equipment.

The station was affiliated to Radio S.A.

References

Radio stations in Sonora
Radio stations established in 1972
1972 establishments in Mexico
2014 disestablishments in Mexico
Radio stations disestablished in 2014
Defunct radio stations in Mexico